John Hart (born 1965) is an American author of thriller novels. His books take place in North Carolina,

Hart has won two Edgar Allan Poe Awards for Best Novel, one in 2008 for Down River, and the second in 2010 for The Last Child. He is the only author in history to win the best novel Edgar Award for consecutive novels. He also won the Barry Award (2010; novel) for The Last Child, the SIBA Book Award (2012; fiction) for Iron House, and the Ian Fleming Steel Dagger (2009) for The Last Child.

Bibliography
2006 The King of Lies
2007 Down River
2009 The Last Child
2011 Iron House
2016 Redemption Road
2018 The Hush
2021 The Unwilling

References

External links
 
 Publisher's Author Page

1965 births
Living people
21st-century American novelists
American male novelists
American thriller writers
Novelists from North Carolina
21st-century American male writers
Barry Award winners